
The Ramsar Convention on Wetlands is an international treaty for the conservation and sustainable utilization of wetlands, i.e., to stem the progressive encroachment on and loss of wetlands now and in the future, recognizing the fundamental ecological functions of wetlands and their economic, cultural, scientific, and recreational value.

Sites
(Site 756) Biebrza National Park, Podlaskie Voivodeship, 
The site consists of a series of temperate zone forested and non-forested bogs that provide a variety of habitats for birds, mammals, fish and plants. The available habitats are ecologically typical of a riparian area including swamps and tussocks separated from cultivated areas by black alder and white willow forested areas.

(Site 1563) Drużno Lake Nature Reserve, Warmian-Masurian Voivodeship, 
The site is a shallow, overgrown lake in the Vistula Delta near the Baltic Sea coast that was once part of the Vistula Lagoon. The lake itself holds a variety of hydrophilic plants, including an array of nymphaeaceae, and is surrounded by marshes dominated by common reed beds that transition into wooded wetlands of black alder.

(Site 284) Karaś Lake Nature Reserve, Warmian-Masurian Voivodeship,
The site is a large, shallow glacial lake typical of those located in the Masurian Lake District. The littoral zone surrounding the lake provides significant opportunities for wetland bird breeding habitats in the extensive reed beds, bogs and in the surrounding wetland forests.

(Site 1566) Karkonosze National Park, Lower Silesian Voivodeship, 
The site consists of three subalpine zone bogs along the Czech border, in the Karkonosze Mountains. The bogs are located at the watershed dividing the Baltic Sea and North Sea basins.
The bogs themselves support an extensive algal community while the surrounding area consists of dwarf Mountain pine and low-growth vegetation.

(Site 166) Łuknajno Lake Nature Reserve, Warmian-Masurian Voivodeship,, Designated 1977
The lake is connected with nearby Sniardwy Lake by a channel. The site is a breeding ground for water birds such as grebe, water rail, moorhen, grey heron, bearded reedling, white-tailed eagle, osprey, rust-coloured kite, cormorant and black tern. The lake has been a protected location since 1937 as a habitat of the mute swan, every year there are a dozen to tens of dozens of nesting pairs, and during moulting they arrive in numbers reaching up to 2,000 birds.

(Site 758) Milicz Ponds Nature Reserve, Lower Silesian Voivodeship,
The ponds are surrounded by forests, meadows and cultivated areas. The ponds provide important spring and autumn migration habitat for a variety of geese,  ducks and other waterbirds.

(Site 1564) Narew National Park, Podlaskie Voivodeship, 
The site is a  section of the Narew River. It is a swampy valley with moraine hills typical of a braided river. Depending on the season and the level of the water table, several riparian area ecosystems are available including swamps, tussocks with surrounding black alder and white willow forested areas.

(Site 1565) Polesie National Park, Lublin Voivodeship, 
The site comprises a vast open lowland landscape with a mosaic of swamps, moors, lakes, rivers and forests located between the basins of the Bug and Wieprz rivers. The site is part of the European Ecological Corridor of the Bug River. The location supports bird species including raptors such as lesser spotted eagle, hen harrier and Montagu's harrier and birds such as aquatic warbler, marsh sandpiper and Eurasian cranes. The area is considered to be an important crossing point for migratory birds. The north-south flyways and east-west flyways of birds meet in the region. The areas consists of boreal Scots pine forests, black alder wetland forests, meadows and peatbog (raised bog, transitional bog and fen) ecosystems.

(Site 285) Seven Island Lake Nature Reserve, Warmian-Masurian Voivodeship,
It is an important way-station for migratory waterbirds such as geese and ducks.

(Site 283) Świdwie Nature Reserve, West Pomeranian Voivodeship, 
A freshwater lake in Wkrzańska Forest near the German border. The lake is dominated by common reed beds and sedge colonies with little open water. It is an important way-station for migratory waterbirds such as geese and ducks.

(Site 757) Słowiński National Park, Pomeranian Voivodeship, Designated 1995
The site consists of set of dunes, brackish lakes, bogs, and wetland forests on the southern Baltic Sea coast between Łeba and Rowy, Poland. Coastal erosion and other geo-morphological processes lead to the creation of sand-bars, forming brackish lakes and bogs.
The area consists of a series of vegetation zones going from the sand communities of the coastline towards the forests of the mainland. The forest includes beech, birch, alder, pine and oak. It is an important way station for migrating wader birds and waterbirds such as geese, ducks and swans. The white-tailed eagle and other birds nest at the site.

(Site 282) Ujście Warty National Park, Lubusz Voivodeship, 
The location is an artificial reservoir, at the confluence of the Warta and Oder rivers, near the German border. The site is set in the Warta River floodplain and is surrounded by marshes. It is an important wintering location for migratory waterbirds such as geese and ducks.

(Site 1567) Wigry National Park, Podlaskie Voivodeship, 
The site is a diverse wetland system around Wigry Lake and 42 smaller glacial lakes surrounded by boreal woodlands. The location shelters three globally endangered bird species, red kite, white-tailed eagle and corn crake.

References

 
Poland